Merck Sharp & Dohme Federal Credit Union (MSDFCU) is an American not-for-profit credit union based in Pennsylvania. It is federally chartered and insured by the National Credit Union Administration (NCUA) and was founded in 1950.

History 
Merck Sharp & Dohme Federal Credit Union was founded in 1950 as The Drug Workers Federal Credit Union to serve the employees of Sharp & Dohme. In 1954, the name was changed to Sharp & Dohme Federal Credit Union.  Then in 1956, the name was changed to Merck Sharp & Dohme Employees Federal Credit Union to reflect Sharp & Dohme’s merger.  In 1963, MSDFCU moved from its Philadelphia location to Merck’s new West Point facility.

In 1993, MSDFCU opened its first stand alone branch in Lansdale, Pennsylvania to serve employees who found it difficult to access the plant site offices and enabled the Credit Union to offer Saturday hours. In 2006, the second stand alone branch was opened as part of strategic decision to build MSDFCU’s Operation Center in Chalfont, Pennsylvania to house the growing staff and members living in the Central Bucks area. To offer access to the growing families of Merck employees and Merck retirees two additional branches were opened: in 2009 – Harleysville, PA and 2015 - Collegeville, PA.

Membership 
Employees or members of Merck Sharp & Dohme FCU affiliated organizations (SEGs) can join the credit union, as can immediate family members of current members.  The Credit Union's main sponsor is Merck & Co., but the Credit Union is also affiliated with over two hundred other organizations. As of 2021, Merck Sharp & Dohme Federal Credit Union has over 30,000 members.

Chief Executive Officer (CEO) 
 Dana DeFilippis, 3/1/2021–present

Wholly Owned Subsidiaries 
New Britain Mortgage is a wholly owned subsidiary of Merck Sharp & Dohme Federal Credit Union that provides mortgages to members and non-members in the state of Pennsylvania.

CU Abstract provides title insurance services and creates closings that favor the credit union philosophy.

Community service 
Merck Sharp & Dohme Federal Credit Union is involved in local philanthropic and financial education activities. Its largest annual fundraisers include the Annual Charity Golf Outing, the Annual Charity Cow Plop, and Annual Raymond O. Hoffman Award, which recognizes the youth who are active in their communities by rewarding them with scholarship money .

References

External links 
Official website
Merck Sharp & Dohme Federal Credit Union

American companies established in 1950
Banks established in 1950
Credit unions based in Pennsylvania